Acute Care of at-Risk Newborns (ACoRN) is a Canadian resuscitation educational program which focuses on the first few hours of neonatal life. This differs from the Neonatal Resuscitation Program which focuses on the first several minutes. It was developed in Winnipeg, Manitoba.

Provinces/Territories implementing ACoRN 
 British Columbia
 Alberta
 Manitoba
 Ontario
 Newfoundland and Labrador
 Nova Scotia
 Prince Edward Island
 The Northwest Territories

References 
 ACoRN Program

Pediatric organizations
Emergency medical procedures